Castel di Sasso is a comune (municipality) in the Province of Caserta in the Italian region Campania, located about  north of Naples and about  northwest of Caserta.

Castel di Sasso borders the following municipalities: Caiazzo, Capua, Liberi, Piana di Monte Verna, Pontelatone.

References

Cities and towns in Campania